Below is a list of squads used in the 1962 African Cup of Nations.

United Arab Republic

Coach:  Mohamed El-Guindi & Hanafy Bastan
|

Ethiopia

Coach:  Yidnekatchew Tessema
|

Tunisia

Coach:  Frane Matošić 
|

Uganda

Coach:  Polycarp Kakooza & Samson Yiga
|

External links
African Nations Cup 1962, RSSSF
CAN 1962
Egyptian Results in African Cup of Nations

Africa Cup of Nations squads
Squads